The River Cummeragh is a river in County Kerry, Ireland.

The river rises in the Dunkerron Mountains on the Iveragh Peninsula. It meanders in a generally south-westerly direction, flowing into the north-eastern side of Lough Currane. The Kerry Way crosses the river at Cahersavane Bridge. The lakes of the river basin are known for their fishing.

References

Rivers of Ireland